The John Holman House is a historic two-story house in Humboldt, Nebraska. It was built with red bricks in 1893 by farmer John Holman. It was designed in the Queen Anne and Châteauesque architectural styles, with a gable roof, dormer windows, and a three-story tower. In the 1940s-1960s, it became a maternity hospital. The house was remodelled as a private residence in the 1970s. It has been listed on the National Register of Historic Places since April 25, 1972.

References

National Register of Historic Places in Richardson County, Nebraska
Queen Anne architecture in Nebraska
Châteauesque architecture in the United States
Houses completed in 1893